Harrison Cosmo Krikoryan Jarvis (born 1 September 1989) is an American-born British actor, musician, and filmmaker. In 2015, he auditioned and was cast to portray the character of Sebastian in William Oldroyd's debut feature film Lady Macbeth  (2016).

Early life
Jarvis was born in Ridgewood, New Jersey, to an Armenian-American mother and English father. He moved to England with his parents as a baby. As a child, he moved to Totnes, Devon, with his mother and younger brother.

Career: 2010–present
Jarvis confirmed his second album's title as Is the World Strange or Am I Strange? on his official Facebook page. The first single released from the album is "Gay Pirates", which was released on 23 January 2011. The single's music video was directed by Jarvis. The song was featured as Record of the Day and AOL's Spinner video of the day. "Gay Pirates" was voted number 85 on the Triple J Hottest 100 of 2011, which aired on Australia Day in 2012.  The album itself was given an 8.5/10 rating from Soundblab album reviews. He announced in an interview with TNC that he had begun work on his first feature film, called The Naughty Room.

The film premièred on BBC Four on the 20 August 2012, shortly after the release of Jarvis' third studio album, titled Think Bigger, the film included multiple songs/variations of songs from the new album in the soundtrack. He toured the UK in late 2012 supporting Mad Dog Mcrea, for whom he penned the song "Waiting on the Hill". The comedy film Hawk(e): The Movie (2013) features several songs by Cosmo Jarvis. In January 2013, "Love This" came in at number 59 on the Triple J Hottest 100, 2012. On the 20 November 2020 Jarvis re-released his 2012 album Think Bigger as "Think Bigger - (2020 Deluxe Edition)" as the 2012 album was never fully released globally. The Think Bigger reissue will contain all of its 11 original recordings remastered for 2020, plus a further 9 rare bonus tracks from that same writing period, including 5 never before heard songs and 4 acoustic live ‘bedroom’ versions of key Think Bigger tracks.

Filmography

Films

Television series

Awards and nominations

Discography

Albums

Singles

References

External links

Living people
American emigrants to England
British indie pop musicians
English pop guitarists
English male guitarists
English male singers
People from Newton Abbot
1989 births
English people of Armenian descent
American people of English descent
American people of Armenian descent
People from Ridgewood, New Jersey
Musicians from Devon
21st-century English singers
21st-century British guitarists
21st-century British male singers
American expatriates in England